Alfonso María Rodríguez Salas, aka Foncho (29 April 1939 – 20 March 1994), was a Spanish footballer, who played as a defender.

Career
Born in La Laguna, Tenerife, Rodríguez played club football for CD Tenerife, CD Eldense, Real Murcia, FC Barcelona and Real Zaragoza.

International goals

Honours
Barcelona
Inter-Cities Fairs Cup: 1965–66
Spanish Cup: 1962–63

References

External links
 
 National team data at BDFutbol
 
 CD Tenerife archives 
 

1939 births
1994 deaths
People from San Cristóbal de La Laguna
Sportspeople from the Province of Santa Cruz de Tenerife
Spanish footballers
Footballers from the Canary Islands
Association football defenders
La Liga players
Segunda División players
CD Tenerife players
CD Eldense footballers
Real Murcia players
FC Barcelona players
Real Zaragoza players
Spain international footballers